Parshvanatha, also , Parshva,  and Parasnath, was the 23rd of 24 Tirthankaras (supreme preacher of dharma) of Jainism. He is the only Tirthankara who gained the title of Kalīkālkalpataru (Kalpavriksha in this "Kali Yuga").

Parshvanatha is one of the earliest Tirthankaras who are acknowledged as historical figures. He was the earliest exponent of Karma philosophy in recorded history. The Jain sources place him between the 9th and 8th centuries BCE whereas historians consider that he lived in the 8th or 7th century BCE. 

Parshvanatha was born 273 years before Mahavira. He was the spiritual successor of 22nd tirthankara Neminatha. He is popularly seen as a propagator and reviver of Jainism. Parshvanatha attained moksha on Mount Sammeda (Madhuban, Jharkhand) popular as Parasnath hill in the Ganges basin, an important Jain pilgrimage site. His iconography is notable for the serpent hood over his head, and his worship often includes Dharanendra and Padmavati (Jainism's serpent Devtā and Devī).

Parshvanatha was born in Benaras (Varanasi), India. Renouncing worldly life, he founded an ascetic community. Texts of the two major Jain sects (Digambaras and Śvētāmbaras) differ on the teachings of Parshvanatha and Mahavira, and this is a foundation of the dispute between the two sects. The Digambaras believe that there was no difference between the teachings of Parshvanatha and Mahavira. 

According to the Śvētāmbaras, Mahavira expanded Parshvanatha's first four restraints with his ideas on ahimsa (non-violence) and added the fifth monastic vow (celibacy). Parshvanatha did not require celibacy, and allowed monks to wear simple outer garments. Śvētāmbara texts, such as section 2.15 of the Acharanga Sutra, say that Mahavira's parents were followers of Parshvanatha (linking Mahavira to a preexisting theology as a reformer of Jain mendicant tradition).

Historicity
Parshvanatha is the earliest Jain tirthankara who is generally acknowledged as a historical figure. According to Paul Dundas, Jain texts such as section 31 of Isibhasiyam provide circumstantial evidence that he lived in ancient India. Historians such as Hermann Jacobi have accepted him as a historical figure because his Chaturyama Dharma (Four Vows) are mentioned in Buddhist texts. In the Manorathapurani, a Buddhist commentary on the Anguttara Nikaya, Vappa, the Buddha's uncle, was a follower of Parsvanatha tradition.

Despite the accepted historicity, some historical claims such as the link between him and Mahavira, whether Mahavira renounced in the ascetic tradition of Parshvanatha and other biographical details have led to different scholarly conclusions. 

Parshvanatha's biography with Jain texts saying that he preceded Mahavira by 273 years and that he lived 100 years. According to Dundas,  historians outside the Jain tradition date Mahavira as contemporaneous with the Buddha in the 5th century BCE and, based on the 273-year gap, date Parshvanatha to the 8th or 7th century BCE.

Doubts about Parshvanatha's historicity are also supported by the oldest Jain texts, which present Mahavira with sporadic mentions of ancient ascetics and teachers without specific names (such as sections 1.4.1 and 1.6.3 of the Acaranga Sutra). The earliest layer of Jain literature on cosmology and universal history pivots around two jinas: the Adinatha (Rishabhanatha) and Mahavira. Stories of Parshvanatha and Neminatha appear in later Jain texts, with the Kalpa Sūtra the first known text. or depth, and the brief descriptions of the tirthankaras are largely modeled on Mahavira. The Kalpa Sūtra is the most ancient known Jain text with the 24 tirthankaras, but it lists 20; three, including Parshvanatha, have brief descriptions compared with Mahavira. Early archaeological finds, such as the statues and reliefs near Mathura, lack iconography such as lions and serpents.

Two of the early bronze images of Parshvanatha can be found on Chhatrapati Shivaji Maharaj Vastu Sangrahalaya and Patna Museum dating back to second century BCE to first century CE. A first century BCE Ayagapata is in State Museum Lucknow containing the image of Parshvanatha. A seventh century CE statue was found in the Asthal Bohar village of Rohtak, Haryana.

Jain biography 

Parshvanatha was the 23rd of 24 tirthankaras in Jain tradition.

Life before renunciation
He was born on the tenth day of the dark half of the Hindu month of Pausha to King Ashwasena and Queen Vamadevi of Varanasi. Parshvanatha belonged to the Ikshvaku dynasty. Before his birth, Jain texts state that he ruled as the god Indra in the 13th heaven of Jain cosmology. While Parshvanatha was in his mother's womb, gods performed the garbha-kalyana (enlivened the fetus). His mother dreamt sixteen auspicious dreams, an indicator in Jain tradition that a tirthankara was about to be born. According to the Jain texts, the thrones of the Indras shook when he was born and the Indras came down to earth to celebrate his janma-kalyanaka (his auspicious birth).

Parshvanatha was born with blue-black skin. A strong, handsome boy, he played with the gods of water, hills and trees. At the age of eight, Parshvanatha began practicing the twelve basic duties of the adult Jain householder. He lived as a prince and soldier in Varanasi. 

According to the Digambara school, Parshvanatha never married; Śvētāmbara texts say that he married Prabhavati, the daughter of Prasenajit (king of Kusasthala). Heinrich Zimmer translated a Jain text that sixteen-year-old Parshvanatha refused to marry when his father told him to do so; he began meditating instead, because the "soul is its only friend".

Renunciation

At age 30, on the 11th day of the moon's waxing in the month of Pausha (December–January), Parshvanatha renounced the world to become a monk after seeing image of Neminatha. He removed his clothes and hair, and began fasting strictly. Parshvanatha meditated for 84 days before he attained omniscience under a dhaataki tree near Benares. His meditation period included asceticism and strict vows. Parshvanatha's practices included careful movement, measured speech, guarded desires, mental restraint and physical activity, essential in Jain tradition to renounce the ego. According to the Jain texts, lions and fawns played around him during his asceticism.

Ahichchhatra is believed to be the place where Parshvanatha attained Kevala Jnana (omniscience). According to Vividha Tirtha Kalpa, Kamath in an attempt to obstruct Parshvanatha from achieving Kevala Jnana caused continuous rain. Parshvanatha was immersed in water up to his neck and to protect him the serpent god Dharanendra held a canopy of thousand hoods over his head and the goddess Padmavati coiled herself around his body. Ahichchhatra Jain temples are built to commemorate Parshvanatha attaining Kēvalajñāna kalyāṇaka. On the 14th day of the moon's waning cycle in the month of Chaitra (March–April), Parshvanatha attained omniscience. Heavenly beings built him a samavasarana (preaching hall), so he could share his knowledge with his followers.

After preaching for 70 years, Parshvanatha attained moksha at Shikharji on Parasnath hill at the age of 100 on Shravana Shukla Saptami according to Lunar Calendar. His moksha (liberation from the cycle of birth and death) in Jain tradition  is celebrated as Moksha Saptami. This day is celebrated on large scale at Parasnath tonk of the mountain, in northern Jharkhand, part of the Parasnath Range by offering Nirvana Laddu (Sugar balls) and reciting of Nirvana Kanda. Parshvanatha has been called  (beloved of the people) by Jains.

Previous lives

Jain mythology contains legends about Parshvanatha's human and animal rebirths and the maturing of his soul towards inner harmony in a manner similar to legends found in other Indian religions. His rebirths include:
 Marubhuti – Vishwabhuti, King Aravinda's prime minister, had two sons; the elder one was Kamath and the younger one was Marubhuti (Parshvanatha). Kamath committed adultery with Marubhuti's wife. The king learnt about the adultery, and asked Marubhuti how his brother should be punished; Marubhuti suggested forgiveness. Kamath went into a forest, became an ascetic and acquired demonic powers to take revenge. Marubhuti went to the forest to invite his brother back home, but Kamath killed Marubhuti by crushing him with a stone. Marubhuti was one of Parshvanatha's earlier rebirths.
 Vajraghosha (Thunder), an elephant – He was then reborn as an elephant because of the "violence of the death and distressing thoughts he harbored at the time of his previous death". Vajraghosha lived in the forests of Vindyachal. Kamath was reborn as a serpent. 

King Aravinda, after the death of his minister's son, renounced his throne and led an ascetic life. When an angry Vajraghosha approached Aravinda, the ascetic saw that the elephant was the reborn Marubhuti. Aravinda asked the elephant to give up "sinful acts, remove his demerits from the past, realize that injuring other beings is the greatest sin, and begin practicing the vows". The elephant realized his error, became calm, and bowed at Aravinda's feet. When Vajraghosha went to a river one day to drink, the serpent Kamath bit him. He died peacefully this time, however, without distressing thoughts.
 Sasiprabha – Vajraghosha was reborn as Sashiprabha (Lord of the Moon) in the twelfth heaven, surrounded by abundant pleasures. Sashiprabha, however, did not let the pleasures distract him and continued his ascetic life.
 Agnivega – Sashiprabha died, and was reborn as Prince Agnivega ("strength of fire"). After he became king, he met a sage who told him about the impermanence of all things and the significance of a spiritual life. Agnivega realized the importance of religious pursuits, and his worldly life lost its charms. He renounced it to lead an ascetic life, joining the sage's monastic community. Agnivega meditated in the Himalayas, reducing his attachment to the outside world. He was bitten by a snake (the reborn Kamath), but the poison did not disturb his inner peace and he calmly accepted his death.

Agnivega was reborn as a god with a life of "twenty-two oceans of years", and the serpent went to the sixth hell. The soul of Marubhuti-Vajraghosa-Sasiprabha-Agnivega was reborn as Parshvanatha. He saved serpents from torture and death during that life; the serpent god Dharanendra and the goddess Padmavati protected him, and are part of Parshvanatha's iconography.

Disciples

According to the Kalpa Sūtra (a Śvētāmbara text), Parshvanatha had 164,000 śrāvakas (male lay followers), 327,000 śrāvikās (female lay followers), 16,000 sādhus (monks) and 38,000 Sadhvis or aryikas (nuns). According to Śvētāmbara tradition, he had eight ganadharas (chief monks): Śubhadatta, Āryaghoṣa, Vasiṣṭha, Brahmacāri, Soma, Śrīdhara, Vīrabhadra and Yaśas. After his death, the Śvētāmbara believe that Śubhadatta became head of the monastic order and was succeeded by Haridatta, Āryasamudra and Keśī.

According to Digambara tradition (including the Avasyaka niryukti), Parshvanatha had 10 ganadharas and Svayambhu was their leader. Śvētāmbara texts such as the Samavayanga and Kalpa Sūtras cite Pushpakula as the chief aryika of his female followers, but the Digambara Tiloyapannati text identifies her as Suloka or Sulocana. Parshvanatha's nirgrantha (without bonds) monastic tradition was influential in ancient India, with Mahavira's parents part of it as lay householders who supported the ascetics.

Teachings

Texts of the two major Jain sects (Digambara and Śvētāmbara) have different views of Parshvanatha and Mahavira's teachings, which underlie disputes between the sects. Digambaras maintain that no difference exists between the teachings of Parshvanatha and Mahavira. According to the Śvētāmbaras, Mahavira expanded the scope of Parshvanatha's first four restraints with his ideas on ahimsa (non-violence) and added the fifth monastic vow (celibacy) to the practice of asceticism. Parshvanatha did not require celibacy, and allowed monks to wear simple outer garments. Śvētāmbara texts such as section 2.15 of the Acharanga Sutra say that Mahavira's parents were followers of Parshvanatha, linking Mahavira to a preexisting theology as a reformer of Jain mendicant tradition.

According to the Śvētāmbara tradition, Parshvanatha and the ascetic community he founded exercised a fourfold restraint; Mahavira stipulated five great vows for his ascetic initiation. This difference and its reason have often been discussed in Śvētāmbara texts. 

The Uttardhyayana Sutra (a Śvētāmbara text) describes Keśin Dālbhya as a follower of Parshvanatha and Indrabhuti Gautama as a disciple of Mahavira and discusses which doctrine is true: the fourfold restraint or the five great vows. Gautama says that there are outward differences, and these differences are "because the moral and intellectual capabilities of the followers of the ford-makers have differed". 

According to Wendy Doniger, Parshvanatha allowed monks to wear clothes; Mahavira recommended nude asceticism, a practice which has been a significant difference between the Digambara and Śvētāmbara traditions.

According to the Śvētāmbara texts, Parshvanatha's four restraints were ahimsa, aparigraha (non-possession), asteya (non-stealing) and satya (non-lying). Ancient Buddhist texts (such as the Samaññaphala Sutta) which mention Jain ideas and Mahavira cite the four restraints, rather than the five vows of later Jain texts. This has led scholars such as Hermann Jacobi to say that when Mahavira and the Buddha met, the Buddhists knew only about the four restraints of the Parshvanatha tradition. Further scholarship suggests a more-complex situation, because some of the earliest Jain literature (such as section 1.8.1 of the Acharanga Sutra) connects Mahavira with three restraints: non-violence, non-lying and non-possession.

The "less than five vows" view of Śvētāmbara texts is not accepted by the Digambaras, a tradition whose canonical texts have been lost and who do not accept Śvētāmbara texts as canonical. Digambaras have a sizable literature, however, which explains their disagreement with Śvētāmbara interpretations. Prafulla Modi rejects the theory of differences between Parshvanatha's and Mahavira's teachings. Champat Rai Jain writes that Śvētāmbara texts insist on celibacy for their monks (the fifth vow in Mahavira's teachings), and there must not have been a difference between the teachings of Parshvanatha and Mahavira.

Padmanabh Jaini writes that the Digambaras interpret "fourfold" as referring "not to four specific vows", but to "four modalities" (which were adapted by Mahavira into five vows). Western and some Indian scholarship "has been essentially Śvētāmbara scholarship", and has largely ignored Digambara literature related to the controversy about Parshvanatha's and Mahavira's teachings. Paul Dundas writes that medieval Jain literature, such as that by the 9th-century Silanka, suggests that the practices of "not using another's property without their explicit permission" and celibacy were interpreted as part of non-possession.

In literature

The Kalpa Sūtra contains biographies of the tirthankaras Parshvanatha and Mahavira. Uvasagharam Stotra is an ode to Parshvanatha which was written by Bhadrabahu. Jinasena's Mahapurāṇa includes "Ādi purāṇa" and Uttarapurana. It was completed by Jinasena's 8th-century disciple, Gunabhadra. "Ādi purāṇa" describes the lives of Rishabhanatha, Bahubali and Bharata. Parshvabhyudaya by Jinsena is a narration of the life of Parshvanatha. Bhayahara Stotra composed by Acharya Manatunga, 7th century, is an adoration of Parshvanatha. Sankhesvara Stotram is hymn to Parshvanatha compiled by Mahopadhyaya Yashovijaya. Shankheshwar Parshvanath Stavan, hymn dedicated to Shankheshwar Parshvanath, is one of the most performed Jain prayer.

Pasanaha-chairu is a hagiography of Parshvanatha composed by Shridhara in 1132 AD. Parshvanatha bhavantara is a kirtan (devotion song), compiled by Gangadas in 1690 AD, which narrates life of previous nine births. The medieval forty-four verse hymn Kalyanamandira stotra, composed by Digambar kumudachandra, is a praise to Parshvanatha is popular among both Digambar and Śvētāmbara. Parshvanatha charite is a poem composed by Shantikirt Muni in 1730 AD, this poem narrates the seven siddhis of Parshvanatha.

Guru Gobind Singh wrote a biography of Parshvanatha in the 17th-century Paranath Avtar, part of the Dasam Granth.

Iconography

Parshvanatha is a popular tirthankara who is worshiped (bhakti) with Rishabhanatha, Shantinatha, Neminatha and Mahavira. He is believed to have the power to remove obstacles and save devotees. In Shvetambara tradition, there are 108 prominent idols of Parshvanath idols these idols derive their name from a geographical region, such as Shankheshwar Parshvanath and Panchasara Parshvanath.

Parshvanatha is usually depicted in a lotus or kayotsarga posture. Statues and paintings show his head shielded by a multi-headed serpent, fanned out like an umbrella. Parshvanatha's snake emblem is carved (or stamped) beneath his legs as an icon identifier. His iconography is usually accompanied by Dharnendra and Padmavati, Jainism's snake god and goddess.

Serpent-hood iconography is not unique to Parshvanatha; it is also found above the icons of Suparshvanatha, the seventh of the 24 tirthankaras, but with a small difference. Suparshvanatha's serpent hood has five heads, and a seven (or more)-headed serpent is found in Parshvanatha icons. Statues of both tirthankaras with serpent hoods have been found in Uttar Pradesh and Tamil Nadu, dating to the 5th to 10th centuries. Earliest images of Parshvanatha having seven snakes over his head date back to first century BCE.

Archeological sites and medieval Parshvantha iconography found in temples and caves include scenes and yaksha. Digambara and Śvētāmbara iconography differs; Śvētāmbara art shows Parshvanatha with a serpent hood and a Ganesha-like yaksha, and Digambara art depicts him with serpent hood and Dhranendra. According to Umakant Premanand Shah, Hindu gods (such as Ganesha) as yaksha and Indra as serving Parshvanatha, assigned them to a subordinate position.

The Parsvanatha ayagapata, a circa 15 CE ayagapata excavated from Kankali Tila, is a tablet of homage dedicated to Parshvanatha. The table represents Parshvanatha in the center surrounded by a bunches of lotus. Parshvanatha is depicted  in dhyāna mudrā with ankle crossed in lotus position seated on a pedestal with a seven-hooded sesha hood above his head and shrivatsa on the chest.

Colossal statues
 The Navagraha Jain Temple has the tallest statue of Parshvanatha: 61 feet (18.6 m), on a 48-foot (14.6-m) pedestal. The statue, in the kayotsarga position, weighs about 185 tons.
 The Gopachal rock cut Jain monuments were built between 1398 and 1536.
 An 11th-century Parshvanatha basadi in Shravanabelagola enshrines an  statue of Parshvanatha in a kayotsarga position.
 Parshvanatha basadi, Halebidu, built by Boppadeva in 1133 AD during the reign of King Vishnuvardhana, contains an  black granite kayotsarga statue of Parshvanatha.
 A  kayotsarga statue was installed in 2011 at the Vahelna Jain Temple.
 VMC has approved construction of 100 foot tall statue in Sama pond in Vadodara.

Temples

Parshvanatha is one of the five most devotionally revered Tirthankaras, along with Mahavira, Rishabhanatha, Neminatha and Shantinatha. Various Jain temple complexes across India feature him, and these are important pilgrimage sites in Jainism. Mount Parasnath of Jharkhand, for example, which is believed to have been a place where 20 out of 24 Tirthankaras achieved nirvana, along with Parshvanatha. Shankheshwar Parshvanath in northern Gujarat, along with Mount Shatrunjaya is considered the holiest shrine among Śvētāmbara murtipujaka. The replicas of Parshvanath temples are popular among Śvētāmbara murtipujaka, for example, Godiji is located in Sindh has a replica in Mumbai. According to Jain belief, worshipping these local replication idols allow them to directly worship to the original idol. Parshvanath is prayed to obtain various desires, especially tantric rites, is therefore also known as Chintamani (wish fulfilling gem) and a tantric diagram called 'Chintamani yantra' is also worship.

Important Parshvanatha temple complexes include: Shikharji (Sammet Sikhar) in Jharkhand, Mirpur Jain Temple, Kanakagiri Jain tirth, Panchasara Jain temple, Humcha Jain temples, Ahi Kshetra, Kallil Temple, Mel Sithamur Jain Math, Pateriaji, Nainagiri, Kundadri, Bijoliaji, Jirawala, Gajpanth, Andeshwar Parshwanath, Bada Gaon, Akkana Basadi, and Guru Basadi.

See also
 Naminath

Notes

References

Citations

Sources

Books

Books

External links
 

 
Tirthankaras
870s BC births
770s BC deaths
Indian Jain monks
8th-century BC Indian Jains
8th-century BC Jain monks
8th-century BC Indian monks
8th-century BC Indian philosophers
8th-century BC religious leaders
9th-century BC religious leaders